Cristina Salvi (born 15 May 1970) is an Italian former professional tennis player.

Born in Arezzo, Salvi reached a career high ranking of 161 playing the professional tour. Her best performance on the WTA Tour was a second round appearance at the 1992 Internazionali di Tennis San Marino.

ITF finals

Singles: 11 (5–6)

Doubles: 21 (13–8)

References

External links
 
 

1970 births
Living people
Italian female tennis players
Sportspeople from Arezzo
20th-century Italian women